Luis Valencia Rodríguez (March 5, 1926 – August 17, 2022) was
an Ecuadorean jurist, diplomat, academic and writer. He served as Ecuador Minister of Foreign Affairs on two occasions. He served as Ecuador ambassador to Bolivia, Brazil, Peru, Venezuela, Argentina and as Permanent Representative of Ecuador to the United Nations in New York. He was member and president of the United Nations Committee on the Elimination of Racial Discrimination.

References 

Foreign ministers of Ecuador
Permanent_Representatives_of_Ecuador_to_the_United_Nations
Ambassadors

1926 births
2022 deaths